The Mitchell Report, officially the Sharm el-Sheikh Fact-Finding Committee Report is a report that was created by an international fact-finding committee, led by former US Senator George Mitchell. The report describes possible causes of the al-Aqsa Intifada, and gives recommendations to end the violence, rebuild confidence and resume negotiations. It was published on 30 April 2001.

Background 

At an Emergency Summit on 17 October 2000, the parties decided to establish a fact-finding committee, which would investigate the causes of the Second Intifada, to pave the way back to negotiations.

Content of the report

Link with violence
According to the Mitchell Report, the government of Israel asserted that

the immediate catalyst for the violence was the breakdown of the Camp David negotiations on 25 July 2000 and the "widespread appreciation in the international community of Palestinian responsibility for the impasse." In this view, Palestinian violence was planned by the PA leadership, and was aimed at "provoking and incurring Palestinian casualties as a means of regaining the diplomatic initiative."

The Palestine Liberation Organization, according to the same report, denied that the Intifada was planned, and asserted that "Camp David represented nothing less than an attempt by Israel to extend the force it exercises on the ground to negotiations."
The report also stated:

From the perspective of the PLO, Israel responded to the disturbances with excessive and illegal use of deadly force against demonstrators; behavior which, in the PLO's view, reflected Israel's contempt for the lives and safety of Palestinians. For Palestinians, the widely seen images of Muhammad al-Durrah in Gaza on September 30, shot as he huddled behind his father, reinforced that perception.

Mitchell concluded,

Recommendations 
In order to get the Israeli–Palestinian peace process back on track after the failure of the Camp David 2000 Summit,

the committee called for action in three phases: 1) an immediate cessation of all violence, 2) rebuilding confidence by a full-scale effort by the Palestinian Authority to prevent Terrorism, the freezing of Israeli settlement activity ... and other confidence-building measures, and 3) resumption of negotiations. Although the Israeli government and the Palestinian Authority accepted the report's conclusions, with some reservations, they failed to implement the findings

Israeli leader Ariel Sharon rejected Israel's main requirement of a settlement freeze by arguing that families already living in settlements will increase in size. Sharon rhetorically asked: "Let's assume that a family is going to have a baby ... What should they do, abortion?"

External links 
The report and official reactions: Report of The Sharm el-Sheikh Fact-Finding Committee. On UNISPAL

References

2001 in international relations
Israeli–Palestinian conflict
Second Intifada